The Price Mark is a 1917 American drama silent film directed by Roy William Neill and written by John B. Ritchie. The film stars Dorothy Dalton, William Conklin, Thurston Hall, Adele Farrington, Edwin Wallock and Dorcas Matthews. The film was released on October 21, 1917, by Paramount Pictures.

Plot

Cast 
Dorothy Dalton as Paula Lee
William Conklin as Fielding Powell
Thurston Hall as Dr. Daniel Melfi
Adele Farrington as Marie
Edwin Wallock as Hassan
Dorcas Matthews as Nakhla
Clio Ayres as Belle de Fargo

Preservation status
A print is preserved in the Library of Congress collection.

References

External links 

1917 films
1910s English-language films
Silent American drama films
1917 drama films
Paramount Pictures films
Films directed by Roy William Neill
American black-and-white films
American silent feature films
1910s American films